Antrak Air was a Ghanaian scheduled airline based in the Airport Residential Area of Accra, Ghana. It started operations in September 2003 and operated scheduled domestic, regional and international services, as well as charter services in West Africa. Its main base was at Kotoka International Airport, Accra.

The company suspended all operations in May 2012 following a fire on board its only aircraft. The company resumed its domestic flights on 6 August after being grounded for about two months, but no longer operates.

Destinations
Antrak Air operated the following scheduled services (at April 2012):
 Africa
 
 Accra - Kotoka International Airport
 Kumasi - Kumasi Airport
 Tamale - Tamale Airport
 Sunyani - Sunyani Airport
 Takoradi - Takoradi Airport

Antrak Air was a legally designated carrier of Ghana to numerous countries worldwide, including the United Kingdom, Germany, South Africa and Saudi Arabia.

In September 2011, Antrak Air filed a legal challenge seeking an injunction to suspend operations of new competitor Starbow Airlines.

Fleet

The Antrak Air fleet consisted of the following aircraft (as of July 2012) :
 1 ATR-42 (cargo)
 3 ATR-72 (leased from Swiftair)

Accidents and incidents
On 22 May 2012, an Antrak Air ATR-42 flying from Tamale to Accra with 33 passengers and four crew caught fire on departure from Tamale Airport. Passengers were evacuated from the aircraft and no fatalities were reported.
In April 2007, an engine fire occurred on the right engine of an ATR-42 with the registration number of 9G-ANT. This flight was operating  the last evening flight from Kumasi to Accra with over 30 passengers. The aircraft landed safely with one engine (left engine) in Accra.

References

External links
 Antrak Air - official site (Archive)
 Ghana-pedia webpage - Antrak Air
 Antrak Air Fleet

Defunct airlines of Ghana
Airlines established in 2003
Airlines disestablished in 2012
Ghanaian companies established in 2003